The tug of war events at the 2001 World Games in Akita was played between 20 and 21 August.  Athletes from 12 nations participated in the tournament. The competition took place at Akita Skydome in Yūwa. Two men's events were held as official sport. Two women's events were invitational sport at this games.

Participating nations

Medal table

Official events

Invitational events

Events

Men's events

Women's events

References

External links
 Tug of War International Federation
 Tug of war on IWGA website
 Results

 
2001 World Games
2001